Carter v. Burr, 113 U.S. 737 (1885), was a case regarding a promissory note that was held by the appellee which secured by mortgage of premises in the City of Washington, DC to the appellant, to decide whether other transactions regarding the property would pay this note, or if it would instead remain in force, along with the right to participate in the proceeds arising from a sale under the mortgage.

Decision
Chief Justice Waite delivered the opinion of the Court.

See also
List of United States Supreme Court cases, volume 113

References

External links
 

United States Supreme Court cases
United States Supreme Court cases of the Waite Court
United States securities case law
1885 in United States case law
1885 in Washington, D.C.
Legal history of the District of Columbia